The 1925 Fairmount Shockers football team was an American football team that represented Fairmount College (now known as Wichita State University) as a member of the Kansas Collegiate Athletic Conference (KCAC) during the 1925 college football season. In its first season under head coach Leonard J. Umnus, the team compiled a 3–1–4 record.

Schedule

References

Fairmount
Wichita State Shockers football seasons
Fairmount Wheatshockers football